Kirsty Barton (born 29 May 1992) is an English football midfielder who last played for Crystal Palace in the FA Women's Championship. She began her youth career at Chelsea L.F.C. where she remained for seven years. She signed for Brighton & Hove Albion in 2011 and became the club's longest-serving player. Barton was instrumental in helping the Seagulls rise from the third tier of English women's football to their subsequent position in the FA WSL, England's top tier. In January 2023, Barton mutually terminated her contract with Crystal Palace.

Barton joined Lewes F.C. Women in January 2023.

References

External links

1992 births
Living people
Brighton & Hove Albion W.F.C. players
Women's Super League players
Women's association football midfielders
English women's footballers
Chelsea F.C. Women players
Crystal Palace F.C. (Women) players
Women's Championship (England) players